Black Ink is the fourth studio album by American rapper Prozak.

Release
It was released on October 9, 2015 via Strange Music.

The album was available for pre-order on August 18, 2015 with extra track "Nobody's Fool".

Singles
The first single, Your Creation, was released on September 2 and the music video dropped on October 7.

Purgatory was released on September 24 as the second single, and The Plague was dropped on September 30 as the third single.

Track listing
All tracks are produced by Seven

References

2015 albums
Strange Music albums
Prozak (rapper) albums
Albums produced by Seven (record producer)